Stranger in Paradise or Strangers in Paradise may refer to:

Literature
 Stranger in Paradise (novel), a 2008 crime novel by Robert B. Parker
 "Stranger in Paradise" (short story), a 1974 short story by Isaac Asimov

Music
 Stranger in Paradise (Peter Bernstein album), 2003
 "Stranger in Paradise" (song), a popular song from the musical Kismet (1953), based on "Polovtsian Dances" from Borodin's Prince Igor
 "Stranger in Paradise" (1987), a song by Diana Ross from Red Hot Rhythm & Blues

Other media
 Strangers in Paradise, a 1984 science fiction film directed by Ulli Lommel
 A Stranger in Paradise, a 2013 American film directed by Corrado Boccia
 Strangers in Paradise, a comic book series by Terry Moore

See also
Stranger Than Paradise, a 1984 film by Jim Jarmusch
Stranger of Paradise: Final Fantasy Origin, a 2022 video game